The cistern of lamina terminalis is one of the a subarachnoid cisterns in the subarachnoid space in the brain.  It lies in front of (rostral to) the lamina terminalis and anterior commissure between the two frontal lobes of the cerebrum.  The cistern contains cerebrospinal fluid, and connects the chiasmatic cistern to the pericallosal cistern.  The anterior cerebral artery and the anterior communicating artery travel within this cistern.

References

Meninges